The 2016 Arizona Republican presidential primary took place on March 22 in the U.S. state of Arizona as one of the Republican Party's primaries ahead of the 2016 presidential election. Despite a late challenge by Texas Senator Ted Cruz, Donald Trump won the primary and netted all 58 delegates in the winner-take-all contest.
On the same day were held Democratic and Green primaries in Arizona, as well as Republican and Democratic caucuses in Utah and Idaho Democratic caucus, so the day was dubbed "Western Tuesday" by media.

Voter suppression controversy

There was controversy surrounding the Arizona primary elections of 2016, specifically having to do with the decrease in polling places in Maricopa County from 200 in 2012 to only 60 in 2016, despite the number of registered voters having increased from 300,000 in 2012 to 800,000 in 2016. This decrease in polling places was most pronounced in minority neighborhoods, most notably Latino neighborhoods, with areas like Central Phoenix having only one polling place for 108,000 voters. There were also reports of voters who had been previously registered coming up as unregistered or registered as an independent, making them ineligible to vote in the closed primary. Voters who did manage to vote had to stand in long lines to cast their ballots, some for as long as five hours. Additionally, voters reported being required to vote with a provisional ballot. In 2005, Arizona threw out 27,878 provisional ballots, counting only about 72.5% of the total provisional ballots reported. Taking into account the effects of the Supreme Court's "gutting of the Voting Rights Act", it's unknown what percentage of the provisional ballots were counted in 2016. This was the first election in the state of Arizona since the 2013 Supreme Court decision to strike down Section 5 of the Voting Rights Act of 1965, which would have previously required states with a history of voter discrimination, including Arizona, to receive Federal approval before implementing any changes to voting laws and practices.

Within a day after the election took place on March 22, a petition went viral on the White House petitions site asking the Department of Justice to investigate voter suppression and election fraud in Arizona. The petition reached 100,000 signatures in 40 hours, and as of June 5, 2016, nearly 220,000 people had signed the petition. The White House responded on May 20, 2016. In addition, Phoenix mayor Greg Stanton asked the Justice Department to launch an investigation into the allegations of voter suppression.

The Department of Justice has since launched a federal investigation into the primary.

Results

Results by county

Analysis
Donald Trump won Arizona decisively, netting all 58 delegates and carrying all counties in the state but two. As The New York Times described, "Mr. Trump proved his appeal among immigration hard-liners, who make up a large bloc of Republicans in the border state."

Trump won the populous cities of Phoenix in Maricopa County, and Tucson in Pima County. He enjoyed support from former Arizona Governor Jan Brewer and Maricopa County Sheriff Joe Arpaio, both of whom hold a hard-line stance against immigration. As Eric Bradner of CNN described, "Their decision to side with Trump, and the size of his win, underscores the potency of Trump's build-a-wall plan with the Republican base."

See also
 2016 Arizona Democratic primary

References

Republican
Arizona
Arizona Republican primaries
Electoral fraud in the United States
Voter suppression
March 2016 events in the United States